Hélène Labarrière (23 October 1963 in Neuilly-sur-Seine) is a French musician in the fields of jazz and improvisation music (double bass and bass guitar).

External links 
The official site of Hélène Labarrière

French jazz bass guitarists
1963 births
Living people